Roser may refer to:

 Roser (name), including a list of people with the name
 Roser (singer) (born 1979), Spanish singer
 Roser Park Historic District, St. Petersburg, Florida
 Studio Roser, a theater in Baden-Württemberg, Germany
 Roser (Krøyer), an 1893 painting by P. S. Krøyer
 2856 Röser, a minor planet

See also
 Rose (disambiguation)